Elections to the French National Assembly were held in French Cameroons on 10 November 1946.

Electoral system
The three seats allocated to the constituency were elected on two separate electoral rolls; French citizens elected one MP from the first college, whilst non-citizens elected two MPs in the second college.

Results

First college

Second college

Seat 1

Seat 2

References

Cameroon
1946 11
1946 in French Cameroon
Cameroon